The Bonnaroo Music and Arts Festival is an American annual four-day music festival developed and founded by Superfly Presents and AC Entertainment. Since its first year in 2002, it has been held at what is now Great Stage Park on a  farm in Manchester, Tennessee. The festival typically starts on the second Thursday in June and lasts four days. It has been held every year except 2020 when it was canceled due to the COVID-19 pandemic and 2021 when it was canceled due to excessive rain from Hurricane Ida flooding the campground. Main attractions of this festival are the multiple stages featuring live music with a  diverse array of musical styles including indie rock, classic rock, world music, hip hop, jazz, Americana, bluegrass, country music, folk, gospel, reggae, pop, electronic, and other alternative music. Musical acts begin Wednesday evening for early arrivers, continued throughout the festival with performances starting each day around noon, and some stages entertaining festival goers until sunrise.

The festival was ranked in 2003 by Rolling Stone magazine as one of the "50 Moments That Changed Rock & Roll", "Festival of the Decade" by Consequence of Sound, and among the 10 Best Festivals by GQ Magazine.

History
Ashley Capps, co-founder of AC Entertainment, developed Bonnaroo following the cancellation of the Hot Summer Nights rock music festival in Knoxville, Tennessee in 1999. Hot Summer Nights, which was a mainstay in Knoxville's World's Fair Park would suspend operations permanently following construction by city officials. Capps would state that the cancellation would be the main drive behind the origin of Bonnaroo, "The closing of the World’s Fair Park for concerts precipitated getting creative and trying to find, ‘OK, if we can’t do this anymore, how can we still participate in the summer outdoor concert business,' and it was from that that Bonnaroo was ultimately launched."

In 1999, the future site of Bonnaroo hosted the Itchycoo Park Festival (named after the song Itchycoo Park by Small Faces), which is considered the spiritual predecessor to the original Bonaroo music festival. Unlike Bonaroo, the Itchycoo Park Festival was considered an overall failure. The first Bonnaroo Music Festival took place in 2002. The founders chose "bonnaroo" (Creole slang meaning a really good time) for its literal meaning and to honor the rich New Orleans music tradition that they had enjoyed in college. Bonnaroo was popularized by New Orleans R&B singer Dr. John with his 1974 album Desitively Bonnaroo. Bonnaroo is derived from the French "bonne"  the feminine agreement of "bon"  meaning "good," and the French "rue"   meaning "street," translating roughly to "the best on the streets". The festival site is known as "the farm" by festival goers and locals, due to its location on what used to be 700 acres of farm land. 

In 2019, after a record breaking festival sell out, it was announced that Live Nation was buying out Superfly's share of Bonnaroo.

The 2020 event was initially pushed back three months until September 2020, and then ultimately cancelled because of health concerns surrounding the COVID-19 pandemic in the United States. The 2021 event was canceled due to torrential rainfall from Hurricane Ida saturating the stage area, campgrounds, and tollbooth area, and making ground conditions unsuitable for vehicle traffic only a few days before the event was scheduled to take place.

In May 2022, it was announced that Hulu will exclusively stream the festival, alongside Austin City Limits Music Festival and Lollapalooza.

Economy
In 2009 the Bonaroo Works Fund was created as a 501(c)(3) nonprofit organization for the festival. The organization awards grants to local non-profits and schools.

By 2013, the direct and indirect economic impact of the festival since inception was estimated at $51 million, including $2.9 million in tax revenue for the year 2012.

Environmentalism
Bonnaroo actively supports recycling and sustainability. In 2011, A Greener Festival recognized Bonnaroo's efforts for the previous three years with an award. In 2004 Bonaroo said it prevented having to collect 120 tons of trash by encouraging fans to recycle. Food and drink are sold in organic and recyclable materials to create less waste. AGF auditors review festivals, as well as requiring their self-evaluation. As of late, Bonnaroo initiates many "green" activities during the festival, such as Planet Roo.

Accolades
When the festival first began in 2002, USA Today referred to Bonnaroo as "The culmination of a musical movement." CNN described it as: "Music and subculture melted together into a pot of creative bubbling energy."

In 2008, it was named "Best Festival" by Rolling Stone magazine, calling it "the ultimate over-the-top summer festival."

The New York Times said "Bonnaroo has revolutionized the modern rock festival" in 2012, and Spin called it the "Best festival of the summer."

Venues

Notable performances
R&B singer D'Angelo marked his return to American stages for the first time in over 12 years on June 9, 2012, with a surprise performance at the festival's annual Superjam. He was backed by members of the R&B collective The Soulquarians, most notably Questlove, James Poyser and Pino Palladino, with guest guitarist Jesse Johnson. The set was composed almost entirely of covers.

In 2009 The Beastie Boys played their final ever show at the festival. 

Other performers have included Widespread Panic (2002, 2003, 2005, 2007, 2008, 2011), Phish (2009, 2012, 2019), Dead & Company (2003, 2004, 2016), U2 (2017), Pearl Jam (2008, 2016), Billy Joel (2015), Mumford and Sons (2011, 2015), Elton John (2014), Eminem (2011, 2018), Jack White (2014), Lionel Richie (2014), The Flaming Lips (2003, 2007, 2010, 2014), Paul McCartney (2013), Tom Petty and The Heartbreakers (2006, 2013), Wu-Tang Clan (2013), Red Hot Chili Peppers (2012, 2017), Radiohead (2006, 2012), Neil Young (2003, 2011), Dave Matthews Band (2005, 2010), Stevie Wonder (2010), Bruce Springsteen (2009), Nine Inch Nails (2009), Metallica (2008), The Police (2007), and Bob Dylan (2004).

Activities 

In addition to music, Bonnaroo used to offer comedy, as well as a tent dedicated to showing movies.

Annual attendance 
Note: all figures are approximate

 2002: 70,000
 2003: 80,000
 2004: 90,000
 2005: 76,000
 2006: 80,000
 2007: 80,000
 2008: 70,000
 2009: 75,000–80,000
 2010: 75,000
 2011: 80,000
 2012: 100,000
 2013: 90,000
 2014: 90,000+ (estimated)
 2015: 74,000 
 2016: 45,500
 2017: 65,000
 2019: 80,000
 2020: 0 (Canceled)
 2021: 0 (Canceled)

By year

 2002 Bonnaroo Music Festival
 2003 Bonnaroo Music Festival
 2004 Bonnaroo Music Festival
 2005 Bonnaroo Music Festival
 2006 Bonnaroo Music Festival 
 2007 Bonnaroo Music Festival
 2008 Bonnaroo Music Festival
 2009 Bonnaroo Music Festival
 2010 Bonnaroo Music Festival
 2011 Bonnaroo Music Festival
 2012 Bonnaroo Music Festival
 2013 Bonnaroo Music Festival 
 2014 Bonnaroo Music Festival
 2015 Bonnaroo Music Festival
 2016 Bonnaroo Music Festival
 2017 Bonnaroo Music Festival
 2018 Bonnaroo Music Festival
 2019 Bonnaroo Music Festival
 2022 Bonnaroo Music Festival
 2023 Bonnaroo Music Festival

See also

 List of historic rock festivals
 List of jam band music festivals

References

External links

Bonnaroo.com Official Bonnaroo Music & Arts Festival website
Bonnaroo 2023 Lineup Announced
GreatStagePark.com Official Site of Bonnaroo Property
Inforoo.com The Unofficial Bonnaroo Message Board
Survival Guide Leo's Unofficial Bonnaroo Survival Guide
How Do You Roo? A Survivor's Pocket Guide to Bonnaroo (Lulu, 2010)  The first (and only) unofficial guidebook to the Bonnaroo Music & Arts Festival

 
2002 establishments in Tennessee
Counterculture festivals
Jam band festivals
Landmarks in Tennessee
Music festivals established in 2002
Music festivals in Tennessee
Rock festivals in the United States
Tourist attractions in Coffee County, Tennessee